The Belarusian men's national ice hockey team is the national ice hockey team that represented Belarus. The team is controlled by the Belarusian Ice Hockey Association. Belarus was ranked 14th in the world by the IIHF as of the 2021 World Ranking.

The team achieved their best result at the Winter Olympics in the quarter-finals of the 2002 Winter Olympics where they beat Sweden and ultimately finished fourth. At the 2005 and 2006 World Championships their coach was Glen Hanlon, who brought their best-ever result in the IIHF World Championship – 6th place in 2006.  He was succeeded by Curt Fraser, who led the team in 2007 and 2008. Hanlon returned to coach the team for the 2009 World Championships in Switzerland.

Due to the 2022 Russian invasion of Ukraine, the International Ice Hockey Federation banned all Belarusian national and club teams from its events indefinitely, and Hockey Canada banned Belarus's "participation in events held in Canada that do not fall under the IIHF’s jurisdiction." In April 2022, the Federation banned Belarus from participating in the 2023 IIHF World Championship.

Tournament record

Olympic Games

World Championship

Team

Current roster
Roster for the 2021 IIHF World Championship.

Head coach: Mikhail Zakharov

Retired numbers
 24 – Ruslan Salei

Uniform evolution

References

External links

IIHF profile

 

National ice hockey teams in Europe